Nettwerk Music Group is the umbrella company for Nettwerk Records, Nettwerk Management, and Nettwerk One Publishing.

Established in 1984, the Vancouver-based company was created by principals Terry McBride and Mark Jowett as a record label to distribute recordings by the band Moev, but the label expanded in Canada and internationally. Specializing in electronic music genres including alternative dance and industrial, the label also became a major player in pop and rock in the late 1980s and 1990s. Their label and management clients include Coldplay, Sarah McLachlan, Dido, and Barenaked Ladies.

Nettwerk has on its label, management and publishing rosters Perfume Genius, The Veils, fun., Passenger, Christina Perri, Guster, Family of the Year, Leisure, Beta Radio, and Ólafur Arnalds.

History
In 1984, Terry McBride and his friend Mark Jowett attended — and both dropped out of — the University of British Columbia. McBride had studied civil engineering while Jowett took classes in creative writing, theater and English. The two met at a house party where Jowett's electronic music band Moev was performing.

Once out of college, McBride began managing Moev, for whom Jowett played guitar. Moev was signed to Go Records, a small San Francisco label that went bankrupt, leaving the band without distribution. They'd spend time at his small apartment with friends such as the members of the electro-industrial band Skinny Puppy, and soon he and Jowett starting putting out their records, along with Moev's and The Grapes of Wrath.

McBride had previously started a label, Noetix, and though it was unsuccessful, he and Jowett were willing to give the record business another try. The company officially opened its doors in 1985. Their first release was The Grapes of Wrath's self-titled EP followed by their full-length, September Bowl of Green. It piqued the attention of Capitol Records, and paved the way for a distribution deal for the band and Nettwerk as a label in 1986. Also in 1986, Nettwerk brought on Ric Arboit as a third partner and managing director.

Despite having an eclectic initial roster of artists, Nettwerk gained a reputation as an industrial dance label, an assumption bolstered by the label's roster of homegrown and licensed industrial acts including Skinny Puppy, Severed Heads, SPK, Manufacture, and Single Gun Theory. On this point, George Maniatis, one of the label's early promotion managers, stated: "'Remission' (Skinny Puppy's mini-album), which was one of our first releases, grabbed everybody by the you-know-whats... Because of it, everybody assumed we were just industrial dance. But we never set out in that direction — It's just that they hit first."

Regardless of intent, the industrial dance and electronic genres proved lucrative and resulted in many international cross-licensing deals. Among them: Belgium's Play It Again Sam label running the Nettwerk Europe imprint in exchange for Nettwerk licensing Front 242 in Canada; licensing Tackhead's North American distribution rights from England's On-U Sound; and cross-licensing with Australia's Volition label which brought Severed Heads and Single Gun Theory to North America. Cross-licensing, including distribution through the majors (Capitol for Skinny Puppy and Atlantic for Moev), and respectable club chart performances (including singles by Manufacture, Severed Heads, and Moev) all contributed to significant visibility and growth for the label at the close of the eighties.

The label's reputation as a strictly electronic dance imprint would soon change. At a show in Halifax, McBride met nineteen-year-old singer-songwriter named Sarah McLachlan – he'd been introduced to her music through Jowett, and tried to recruit her to front Moev. Her parents initially rejected the idea, saying she was too young, but by then she had her moved out of her parents home and rented an apartment down the street while in her first year of art school. McBride offered McLachlan a five-record deal, and she agreed, saying “Ok. Sure. Why not?"

At this point, McBride and Jowett had moved Nettwerk into a new office, and McLachlan relocated to Vancouver to write, finishing her debut, Touch, in 1988. The first single, "Vox", was a hit, and led to her signing a worldwide deal with Arista Records (Nettwerk retained her for Canada). She followed up with Solace in 1991 and Fumbling Towards Ecstasy in 1993. Surfacing in 1997 contained two hit singles; "Building a Mystery" and "I Will Remember You", and winning two Grammy Awards.

In 1994, Nettwerk switched its distribution from Capitol–EMI to Sony Music, later Sony BMG.

Lilith Fair was initially McLachlan's idea; she was tired of the standard touring, and wanted to do something different, something inventive. Though McBride was resistant at first, he pushed forward, and they assembled a lineup that they then were told was "suicidal": Paula Cole, Aimee Mann, Patti Smith, Lisa Loeb and McLachlan to close. It was a success, and the next summer they launched a touring version – it grossed $16 million, a large portion of which was donated women's charities. Founded by McLachlan, McBride, Nettwerk co-owner Dan Fraser and New York talent agent Marty Diamond, Lilith Fair was the top-grossing festival tour of 1997 and ranked 16th among the year's Top 100 Tours. in 1998, Lilith Fair grossed just over $6 million and remained the top-grossing summer concert package tour of the season.

Nettwerk then signed Barenaked Ladies, at the time viewed as a novelty act. After steady radio promotion, McBride booked the band for a show at City Hall Plaza in Boston to launch their album Stunt. The concert drew 80,000 fans, and the first single, "One Week", reached number one on the charts, also earning the band a Grammy nomination and a Juno Award for Best Pop Album. They have since gone on to sell over 10 million albums.

Nettwerk brought on Dido in 1999, as well as Sum 41. Avril Lavigne was sixteen when she walked into the Nettwerk offices; Arista had sent her to McBride, hoping to figure out what to make of her. Though Lavigne would release her records through Arista, she continued with Nettwerk for her management.

In 2000, EMI decided against a North American release for the album of a new signing by their British sub-label Parlophone. This album, Parachutes by the band Coldplay, was picked up by Nettwerk for release in Canada and the United States.

Nettwerk embraced new digital formats. McBride studied reports showing the sea change in fan preference, and realized that he'd rather cater to the growing MP3 culture rather than work against it. In 2005, Nettmusic became one of the first major music companies to sell MP3s free of DRM (digital rights management), and supported the consumer case in the battle against the Recording Industry Association of America. Nettwerk has offered to pay the legal fees of a teenager in Texas who is being sued for downloading songs.

At the same time, Nettwerk continued to focus on other new, innovative and both artist-and-fan friendly models. McBride conceived of a concept he called "collapsed copyright", set to revolve around a new business model that empowered artists themselves and not just the corporations. The premise allowed artists to release music under their own label (therefore retaining the intellectual property), marketed and promoted through Nettwerk.

On June 9, 2010, Nettwerk announced that for its distribution and marketing in the United States, it would depart from Sony Music and its catalogue would now be distributed by WMG's Alternative Distribution Alliance. In 2013, Nettwerk raised $10.25 million in equity financing to sign artists and purchase catalogs.

In July, 2016, Nettwerk sold its publishing catalog to KobaltInvestment Fund, an independent investment fund established in 2011.

In September 2017 Nettwerk Records announced that The Ballroom Thieves joined the label roster.

Nutone
In 2008, Nettwerk founder Terry McBride revived a retired sub-label of Nettwerk called Nutone Records, with the objective of releasing devotional, chant and world music. He also launched a chain of wellness centers in Canada called YYoga.

Nettwerk roster

Music roster

Management roster

Publishing roster

Artists

Writers

See also
 List of record labels

Sources

References

External links
 

Canadian independent record labels
Online music stores of Canada
Companies based in Vancouver
Industrial record labels
1984 establishments in British Columbia
Record labels established in 1984
Bluegrass record labels
EMI